The Solanales are an order of flowering plants, included in the asterid group of dicotyledons. Some older sources used the name Polemoniales for this order.

Taxonomy

Under the older Cronquist system, the latter three families were placed elsewhere, and a number of others were included:

 Family Duckeodendraceae (now treated as a synonym of Solanaceae)
 Family Nolanaceae (now treated as a synonym of Solanaceae)
 Family Cuscutaceae (now treated as a synonym of Convolvulaceae)
 Family Retziaceae (now treated as a synonym of Stilbaceae, order Lamiales)
 Family Menyanthaceae (now placed in order Asterales)
 Family Polemoniaceae (now placed in order Ericales)
 Family Hydrophyllaceae (now treated as a synonym of Boraginaceae)

In the classification system of Dahlgren the Solanales were in the superorder Solaniflorae (also called Solananae).

The following families are included here in newer systems such as that of the Angiosperm Phylogeny Group (APG):

 Family Solanaceae (nightshade family; includes Nolanaceae as well as potatoes, eggplants, tomatoes, chilli peppers, tobacco, and petunias.)
 Family Convolvulaceae (morning glory and sweet potato)
 Family Montiniaceae
 Family Sphenocleaceae
 Family Hydroleaceae

The APG II classification treats the Solanales in the group Euasterids I.

References

External links
 
 Systema Naturae 2000

 
Angiosperm orders